The  is the 43rd edition of the Japan Academy Film Prize, an award presented by the Nippon Academy-Sho Association to award excellence in filmmaking.

Nominees

Awards

References

External links 
  - 

Japan Academy Prize
2019 in Japanese cinema
Japan Academy Film Prize
March 2020 events in Japan